Laura Regan (born October 17, 1974) is a Canadian actress. She has had leading and supporting roles in the films Saving Jessica Lynch (2003), My Little Eye (2002), They (2002), Dead Silence (2007), and Atlas Shrugged: Part III (2014). She had a recurring role as Jennifer Crane in the TV series Mad Men

Personal life
Regan was born in Halifax, Nova Scotia, the youngest in a family of seven. Regan is the daughter of Anita Carole Regan (née Harrison) and former Nova Scotia premier Gerald Regan; and sister of Geoff Regan, former Speaker of the Canadian House of Commons and former federal Minister of Fisheries and Oceans, and Live at Five's Nancy Regan. Her maternal grandfather was Saskatchewan MP John Harrison.

Career
Regan's first role was in M. Night Shyamalan's Unbreakable. She landed her first starring role in Robert Harmon's They.

Filmography

References

External links
 

1974 births
Actresses from Halifax, Nova Scotia
Canadian film actresses
Canadian people of Irish descent
Canadian television actresses
Living people
Laura
21st-century Canadian actresses